The 1940 Soviet football championship in Gruppa B was fifth season of the (second tier) professional football competitions in the Soviet Union. It was also the second season after revival of the second tier competitions and the last season before the Nazi Germany invaded the Soviet Union with the ongoing World War II.

The season started on 2 May 1940 (following the International Workers' Day) with matches in Ukraine and the Caucasus republics. The season ended on 27 October 1940 in Kiev.

Teams
The league was reduced almost in half from 23 to 14 teams. The competitions were conducted in double round robin format where each team is playing with every other twice, at home and away.

Relegated
Two teams were relegated from the 1939 Gruppa A
 FC Krasnaya Zaria Leningrad – 13th place (debut)
 FC Dinamo Odessa – 14th place (debut, merged with Pischevik)
 Former Dinamo Odessa players continued to play under Pischevik's colors, while Pischevik team discontinued its participation at republican level in Ukraine.

Promoted
 FC Dinamo Minsk – Champion of the Belorussian SSR (debut)
 FC Pischevik Odessa – Runner-up of the Ukrainian SSR (debut)

Renamed
 FC Krasnaya Zaria Leningrad was previously known as FC Elektrik Leningrad
 FC Stroitel Baku was previously known as FC Temp Baku

League Standings

Top scorers

Number of teams by republics

See also
 Soviet First League

External links
 1940 Group B. RSSSF

1940
2
Soviet
Soviet